The 2013 Manitoba Liquor & Lotteries Women's Classic was held from October 25 to 28 at the Fort Rouge Curling Club in Winnipeg, Manitoba as part of the 2013–14 World Curling Tour. The event was the second women's Grand Slam of the season. The event was held in a triple knockout format, and the purse for the event was CAD$60,000, of which the winner received CAD$15,000.

In just the second all-Manitoba final in the event's history, the Jennifer Jones rink defeated Jill Thurston's rink, winning their first Grand Slam event since 2011 and their first Manitoba Liquor & Lotteries event since it became a Grand Slam. Thurston made her first career Grand Slam playoffs appearance, as well as her first career Grand Slam final.

Teams
The teams are listed as follows:

Knockout results
The draw is listed as follows:

A event

B event

C event

Playoffs

References

External links

2013 in Canadian curling
2013 in Manitoba
Curling competitions in Winnipeg
October 2013 sports events in Canada